The pale-bellied white-eye (Zosterops consobrinorum) is a species of bird in the family Zosteropidae. It is endemic to SE Sulawesi in Indonesia. Its natural habitat is subtropical or tropical moist lowland forest. The species has a limited distribution  and also appears to be sensitive to human disturbance.

Taxonomy and systematics 

Although not yet recognized as a subspecies of the pale-bellied white-eye, in 2003 a similar bird was discovered near the village of Wanci on Wangi-wangi Island and provisionally named the Wangi-Wangi white-eye (Zosterops sp. nov.). This island is its only known home and is part of the Tukangbesi Islands to the southeast of Sulawesi in Indonesia.

The Wangi-Wangi white-eye has a number of differences from the pale-bellied white-eye including larger size, a black body, a long yellow beak, a gray breast and pale feet. Like most white-eyes it has a white ring around the eye and green upperparts.

References

Birds described in 1904
Endemic birds of Sulawesi
Zosterops
Taxonomy articles created by Polbot